Huberman is a surname. Notable people with the surname include:

Amy Huberman (born 1979), Irish actress
Andrew D. Huberman (born 1975), American neuroscientist and professor
Bernardo Huberman (fl. after 1966), American computer scientist
Bronisław Huberman (1882–1947), Polish violinist
Leo Huberman (1903–1968), American writer
Mark Huberman (born 1981), Irish actor
Ron Huberman (born 1971), American administrator

See also